Autumn Roses may refer to:

Autumn Roses (1931 film), a 1931 Argentine short musical film
Autumn Roses (1943 film), a 1943 Argentine film